Miljan Škrbić (Serbian Cyrillic: Миљан Шкрбић; born 18 September 1995) is a Serbian professional footballer who plays as a centre-forward for Radnički Niš.

Career
On 2 March 2013, Škrbić scored on his official debut for OFK Beograd after coming on as a substitute in a 3–1 home loss to Jagodina. In September 2016, Škrbić joined Slovenian club Krško. He left Krško in 2018 and joined Giresunspor in January 2019. On 6 February 2020, Škrbić signed a two-and-a-half-year contract with Bosnian Premier League club Zrinjski Mostar. He made his official debut for Zrinjski in a 2–0 league win against Čelik Zenica on 23 February 2020. Škrbić terminated his contract with Zrinjski and left the club in June 2021.

Career statistics

Club

References

External links
Miljan Škrbić at Sofascore
PrvaLiga profile

1995 births
Living people
People from Crvenka
Serbian footballers
Serbia youth international footballers
Serbian expatriate footballers
Serbian expatriate sportspeople in Slovenia
Expatriate footballers in Slovenia
Serbian expatriate sportspeople in Turkey
Expatriate footballers in Turkey
Serbian expatriate sportspeople in Bosnia and Herzegovina
Expatriate footballers in Bosnia and Herzegovina
Serbian SuperLiga players
Slovenian PrvaLiga players
TFF First League players
Premier League of Bosnia and Herzegovina players
OFK Beograd players
NK Krško players
Giresunspor footballers
HŠK Zrinjski Mostar players
Association football forwards